Rasbora baliensis is a species of cyprinid fish in the genus Rasbora.
It is found only on Bali in Indonesia where it is restricted to the crater lake, Lake Bratan, which sits at 1231m above sea level.

Sources

Rasboras
Cyprinid fish of Asia
Freshwater fish of Indonesia
Taxa named by Carl Leavitt Hubbs
Taxa named by Martin Ralph Brittan
Fish described in 1954
Taxonomy articles created by Polbot